Chengtian Temple, may refer to:

Pagoda of Chengtian Temple, a Chinese pagoda on the site of a previous Buddhist temple in Yinchuan, Ningxia, China.

Chengtian Temple (Quanzhou), in Quanzhou, Fujian, China